The 1888 United States presidential election in Kentucky took place on November 6, 1888. All contemporary thirty-eight states were part of the 1888 United States presidential election. Kentucky voters chose thirteen electors to the Electoral College, which selected the president and vice president.

Background and vote
Ever since the Civil War, Kentucky had been shaped politically by divisions created by that war between secessionist, Democratic counties and Unionist, Republican ones, although the state as a whole leaned Democratic throughout this era and the GOP would never carry the state during the Third Party System at either presidential or gubernatorial level. What would become a long-lived partisan system after the state was freed from the direct control of former Confederates would not be seriously affected by the first post-war insurgency movement – that of the Greenback Party at the tail end of the 1870s in the secessionist Jackson Purchase region. Incumbent president Grover Cleveland lost four points on his 1884 performance, but still carried the state comfortably against GOP nominee Benjamin Harrison.

, this is the last occasion when a Democratic presidential candidate passed thirty percent in rock-ribbed Unionist and Republican Clinton County.

Results

Results by county

Notes

References 

Kentucky
1888
1888 Kentucky elections